The so-called Violin Concerto No. 6 in E major, K. 268/365b/Anh.C. 14.04, was once thought to have been composed by Wolfgang Amadeus Mozart, but is now considered to be the work of  (1767–1838).

Structure 
The concerto has the usual fast-slow-fast structure and lasts around 23 minutes. The movements are:

Background 
This violin concerto was first published by Johann André in 1799. A contemporary writer had stated the work to have been composed in 1784 and that it had been played to Eck by Mozart, although Mozart's widow Constanze stated that if authentic, the work must have been composed earlier. Ludwig von Köchel dated the work to 1776 in his catalogue, labelling it K. 268. A common hypothesis made in the later half of the 19th century was that the piece was based on authentic Mozart material but constructed by a less skilled composer. Cecil B. Oldman believed that the work had stylistic similarities to Mozart's sinfonia concertante for violin and viola, K. 364, and that Eck was the completer of the work, writing in a footnote to p. 1469 of The Letters of Mozart and his Family Volume III:

Alfred Einstein dated the work to 1780 in his third edition of the Köchel catalogue, renumbering it as K. 365b. In a 1978 comparison of this concerto with several known Eck violin concertos, Walter Lebermann confirmed the work's probable attribution to Eck and gave a dating of before 1790. The 1980 sixth edition of the Köchel catalogue removed this concerto from the main catalogue and into the appendix for spurious and doubtful works as K. Anh.C 14.04, and the work is not included in the Neue Mozart-Ausgabe.

References

External links
 

6
Compositions in E-flat major
Mozart: spurious and doubtful works